"Brother Oh Brother" is a song recorded by Swedish singer Måns Zelmerlöw. It was released on 10 October 2007 as a digital download in Sweden. It was released as the third single from his debut studio album Stand by For... (2007). The song was written by Fredrik Kempe and Henrik Wikström. The song peaked at 7th position at Sverigetopplistan, and also became a Svensktoppen success staying on the chart for eight weeks between 18 November-6 January 2008 before leaving chart. The song was also performed by Black-Ingvars at Dansbandskampen 2009.

Track listing

Charts

Weekly charts

Year-end charts

Release history

References

2007 singles
Måns Zelmerlöw songs
Songs written by Fredrik Kempe
Songs written by Henrik Wikström
Swedish-language songs
2007 songs
Warner Music Group singles
English-language Swedish songs